The Normandien Formation is a Triassic-age rock formation located in Free State, South Africa. It is where the fossils of Ericiolacerta, a subtaxa of Ericiolacertidae, were found.

Fossil content 
Among others, these fossils were reported from the formation:

 Aenigmasaurus grallator
 Broomistega putterilli
 Ericiolacerta parva
 Galesaurus planiceps
 Lydekkerina huxleyi
 Lystrosaurus curvatus, L. declivis, L. murrayi
 Micropholis stowi
 Moschorhinus kitchingi
 Myosaurus gracilis
 Olivierosuchus parringtoni
 Platycraniellus elegans
 Prolacerta broomi
 Prolystrosaurus strigops
 Proterosuchus fergusi
 Scaloposaurus constrictus
 Tetracynodon darti
 Thrinaxodon liorhinus

See also 
 List of fossiliferous stratigraphic units in South Africa
 Geology of South Africa
 Ericiolacertidae

References

Further reading 
 A. S. Brink. 1965. A new ictidosuchid (Scaloposauria) from the Lystrosaurus-zone. Palaeontologia Africana 9:129-138

Geologic formations of South Africa
Triassic System of Africa
Triassic South Africa
Induan Stage
Sandstone formations
Paleontology in South Africa